Zinc finger protein ZPR1 is a protein that in humans is encoded by the ZNF259 gene.

References

Further reading

External links 
 

Transcription factors